The Maddox Brothers and Rose were an American country music group active from the 1930s to 1950s, consisting of four brothers, Fred, Cal, Cliff, and Don Maddox, along with their sister Rose; Cliff died in 1949 and was replaced by brother Henry. Originating in Alabama, but gaining success after the Maddox family relocated to California during the Great Depression, the group were among the earliest "hillbilly music" stars to emerge from the West Coast. The group disbanded in 1956, with Rose Maddox embarking on a solo career.

Biography
The family hailed from Boaz, Alabama, United States, but rode the rails and hitch-hiked to California in 1933 when the band members were still children, following the failed efforts of their sharecropper parents  during the early part of the Depression. They were a little in advance of the flood of Okies who were to flood the state in the 1930s. They struggled to make a living as itinerant fruit and vegetable pickers, following the harvest as far north as Washington and as far east as Arizona, as well as the San Joaquin Valley. They often worked from dawn to dusk, sleeping and eating on the ground.

Having settled in Modesto, California, the family developed their musical ability, and in 1937, performed on the radio, sponsored by a local furniture store. In 1939, they entered a hillbilly band competition at the centennial Sacramento State Fair after driving to Sacramento in their Model A. When they took the stage, they tore through "Sally Let Your Bangs Hang Down" with rocking rhythms and risqué lyrics. They became, officially, California's best hillbilly band.

The brothers and Rose appeared at places such as the 97th Street Corral in Los Angeles.

From 1946-1951, the group recorded for 4 Star Records (Hollywood), then for Columbia Records. Some 4 Star masters were leased and released by US.-Decca Records at the beginning of the 1950s. Rose Maddox stated: "We were called hillbilly singers — not country — then. No, none of this country music then. People just called us hillbilly... People tell me that I was one of the first women to sing what I sang — country boogie. I guess I was. There was no rock 'n' roll in those early days, before 1955. Only country boogie. My brothers also played that way. We called it country then."

Fred Maddox played upright bass using the "slap bass" technique as early as 1937.

Fred Maddox's bass is displayed at the Experience Music Project in Seattle. "They wanted his bass because they believe he might have hit the first note of rock 'n' roll on it."

Don Maddox was the last surviving member of the band and lived in Ashland, Oregon. He experienced a career resurgence 50 years after his success with Maddox Bros and Rose, while he played at the Britt Festival in Jacksonville, Oregon, opening for Big and Rich, performing at the Muddy Roots festival in Cookeville, Tennessee, in 2011 and 2012, playing on the Marty Stuart show, and receiving a standing ovation show at the Grand Ole Opry. He also performed in Las Vegas at the first annual Rockabilly Rockout at the Gold Coast Casino on October 5, 2014.

Don Maddox died on September 12, 2021, at the age of 98.

Band members
 Cliff Maddox (born May 19, 1912, Boaz, Alabama – died August 8, 1949, Modesto, California)
 Cal Maddox (born November 3, 1915, Boaz, Alabama – died July 2, 1968, Jackson County, Oregon)
 Fred Maddox (born July 3, 1919, Boaz, Alabama – died October 29, 1992, Kern, California)
 Don Maddox (born December 7, 1922, Boaz, Alabama – died September 12, 2021)
 Rose Maddox (born August 15, 1925, Boaz, Alabama – died April 15, 1998, Ashland, Oregon)
 Henry Maddox (born March 19, 1928, Boaz, Alabama – died June 11, 1974, Ashland, Oregon)
 Bud Duncan (born March 18, 1928, Pollard, Arkansas)

Discography
 A Collection of Standard Sacred Songs (King, 1959)
 Maddox Bros. and Rose (King, 1960)
 I'll Write Your Name In the Sand (King, 1961) 
 Maddox Brothers and Rose (Wrangler, 1962)
 Go Honky Tonkin! (Hilltop, 1965)
 America's Most Colorful Hillbilly Band, v.1 (Arhoolie, 1976 [LP]; 1993 [CD])
 America's Most Colorful Hillbilly Band, v.2 (Arhoolie, 1976 [LP]; 1995 [CD])
 Old Pals of Yesterday (Picc-A-Dilly, 1980) 
 On the Air, v.1 (Arhoolie, 1983 [LP]; 1996 [CD])
 Maddox Bros. and Rose: Columbia Historic Edition (Columbia, 1984)
 On the Air, v.2 (Arhoolie, 1985 [LP]; 1996 [CD])
 Live - On the Radio (Arhoolie, 1996) recorded 1953
 The Hillbilly Boogie Years (Rockateer, 1996) all Columbia recordings
 The Most Colorful Hillbilly Band in America (Bear Family, 1998) 4-CD set
 A Proper Introduction to Maddox Brothers & Rose: That'll Learn Ya Durn Ya (Proper, 2004)

References

External links
 Biography of the Maddox Brothers and Rose 
Photo, discography, label shots and samples
 
Additional samples and label shots
Recordings of appearances
Listing of all Maddox Bros. & Rose songs and alternatives

1937 establishments in Alabama
1956 disestablishments in Alabama
Country music groups from Alabama
Country music groups from California
Western swing musical groups
Family musical groups
People from Boaz, Alabama
Musical groups from California
Four Star Records artists
Apex Records artists
Columbia Records artists
Decca Records artists
Musical groups established in 1937
Musical groups disestablished in 1956
Bakersfield sound
People from Modesto, California